Ali Abbass Alwan is an Iraqi academic. He was president of the University of Basrah from 2005 to 2009.

References

Living people
Year of birth missing (living people)
Place of birth missing (living people)
Academic staff of the University of Basrah
21st-century Iraqi people